The Wuzhen Initiative was proposed on the 2nd World Internet Conference (WIC for short, or Wuzhen Summit). The conference was held at Wuzhen, China, from December 16 to 18, 2015. Wuzhen summit 2016 gathered more than 2000 representatives from over 120 countries and regions and over 20 international organizations. On the Conference a high-level advisory council (HAC for short) for the WIC's organizing committee secretariat was established, and the Wuzhen Initiative was proposed.

Influence

Global internet governance 
The Second Wuzhen Summit closed with the release of the Wuzhen Initiative, which can be regarded as a milestone calling on all countries to promote Internet development, foster cultural diversity in cyber space, share the fruits of Internet development, ensure peace and security in cyber space, and improve global Internet governance. The initiative was released with the conference.

Wuzhen Initiative has reflected each stakeholder's hope and responsibility to promote the construction of cyberspace and the innovation of management, technology and system of development and governance, as well as their confidence and determination to enhance the interconnected cyberspace shared and governed by all the international society. No doubt it is a remarkable achievement in global Internet governance.

Consideration on humanity and mankind 
Besides, Wuzhen Initiative is also highly praised for its thoughtful and adequate consideration on humanity. It includes one time of "people" and seven times of "mankind" in the text, and specifically mentions the Internet needs and online protection of teenagers. The ultimate goal of the Initiative is to build a common spiritual homeland for all people on this planet.

International Comments 
Fadi Chehadé, the president of ICANN, thinks the Wuzhen Initiative is a good step in stimulating technological innovation and new approaches to innovate and govern the Internet.

References

Internet in China
2015 in China